The 1956 La Flèche Wallonne was the 20th edition of La Flèche Wallonne cycle race and was held on 5 May 1956. The race started in Charleroi and finished in Liège. The race was won by Richard Van Genechten.

General classification

References

1956 in road cycling
1956
1956 in Belgian sport
1956 Challenge Desgrange-Colombo